"Sinning with You" is a song recorded by American country singer Sam Hunt. He co-wrote the track with Josh Osborne, Paul DiGiovanni, and Emily Weisband. It was a promotional single released off his second studio album Southside.

Background and release
Hunt stated that the song is a "metaphor for a small-town guy who was raised with traditional values, a lot of those rooted in church and faith". He added "important we think about these things and don’t accept rules because they are rules. We should try to understand the ‘whys’ behind the things we do, and the moral structure we apply to our lives".

Hunt debuted the song live at a "Bud Light House Party" event in Calgary, Alberta in September 2019. It was the first new song performed by Hunt after he had gone over two years since releasing the single "Downtown's Dead". He officially stated "Sinning with You" would be on his second studio album after performing it.

Critical reception
Craig Shelburne of CMT stated that the song showed "serious reflection". Tammy Ragusa of One Country called the song "intimate and insightful", saying Hunt did not "deviate very far from what has worked in the past". Kelli Boyle of E! described "Sinning with You" as an "introspective look at religion and how a person's relationship with it can evolve over time". Heran Mamo of Billboard referred to the song as an "emotional reflection heard in the delicate guitar strings".

Commercial performance
"Sinning with You" peaked at number 92  on the Billboard Hot 100 in the United States, and number 27 on the Hot Country Songs chart. It also reached a peak of number 38 on the Hot Canadian Digital Songs chart.

Charts

References

2020 songs
Sam Hunt songs
Songs written by Sam Hunt
Songs written by Josh Osborne
Songs written by Emily Weisband